The 2013–14 High Point Panthers men's basketball team represented High Point University during the 2013–14 NCAA Division I men's basketball season. The Panthers, led by fifth year head coach Scott Cherry, played their home games at the Millis Athletic Convocation Center and were members of the North Division of the Big South Conference. They finished the season 16–15, 12–4 in Big South play to be champions of the North Division and, with the conferences best overall conference record, they were regular season Big South champions. They lost in the quarterfinals of the Big South tournament to Winthrop. As a regular season conference champions who failed to win their conference tournament, they earned an automatic bid to the National Invitation Tournament where they lost in the first round to Minnesota.

Roster

Schedule

|-
!colspan=9 style="background:#4F007D; color:#ffffff;"| Exhibition

|-
!colspan=9 style="background:#4F007D; color:#ffffff;"| Regular season

|-
!colspan=9 style="background:#4F007D; color:#ffffff;"| Big South tournament

|-
!colspan=9 style="background:#4F007D; color:#ffffff;"| NIT

References

High Point Panthers men's basketball seasons
High Point
High Point